Salem El-Margini (born 1957) is a Libyan sprinter. He competed in the men's 4 × 400 metres relay at the 1980 Summer Olympics.

References

1957 births
Living people
Athletes (track and field) at the 1980 Summer Olympics
Libyan male sprinters
Libyan male middle-distance runners
Olympic athletes of Libya
Place of birth missing (living people)